Seeing Stars may refer to
 Seeing Stars (1922 film), a one-reel "trailer" film with appearances by Charlie Chaplin and Buster Keaton
 Seeing Stars (1932 film), a Krazy Kat animated short
 Seeing Stars (TV series), an 1950s Australian variety TV show
 Seeing Stars (band/album), British band of the 1990s with an eponymous album
 Seeing Stars, the second episode of the second season of Helluva Boss
 For seeing stars, the visual illusion often used as a device in cartoons, see phosphene